Tomasz Mazurkiewicz (born 23 November 1981) is a Polish former footballer who played as a midfielder. He became chairman of KP Sopot after retiring from football.

Career
He first played professional football for Legia Warsaw (1999–2001). He was loaned to the Danish club AGF Aarhus in the fall of 2001 before being transferred for a reported amount of 2.7 million Danish Krone in March 2002. His performance at AGF was affected by injuries. In 2005–2006 Mazurkiewicz played for SønderjyskE. In 2006, he returned to Poland and played three seasons for Arka Gdynia. He then returned to Denmark to play as an amateur for AGF's reserve team before returning once more to Poland to join GKS Katowice.

References

External links
 

1981 births
Living people
People from Sopot
Polish footballers
Legia Warsaw players
Aarhus Gymnastikforening players
Arka Gdynia players
SønderjyskE Fodbold players
GKS Katowice players
Association football midfielders
Poland international footballers